Karina Lykhvar (born 11 December 1998) is an Israeli female rhythmic gymnast.

Karina has won a total of two bronze medals, as a member of the national squad, at the European Championships (2014 and 2016), and eventually competed alongside her teammates Yuval Filo, Alona Koshevatskiy, Ekaterina Levina, and Ida Mayrin at the 2016 Summer Olympics in Rio de Janeiro, finishing outside of medals in the group all-around final with a sixth-place score of 34.549.

References

External links
 
 

1998 births
Living people
Israeli rhythmic gymnasts
Sportspeople from Petah Tikva
Gymnasts at the 2016 Summer Olympics
Olympic gymnasts of Israel
Gymnasts at the 2015 European Games
European Games medalists in gymnastics
European Games silver medalists for Israel
European Games bronze medalists for Israel
Medalists at the Rhythmic Gymnastics World Championships
Medalists at the Rhythmic Gymnastics European Championships